The Embassy of France in Ireland is the diplomatic mission of the French Republic in Ireland. It is located in Dublin.

As of September 2020, the current ambassador to Ireland is Vincent Guérend, who had previously served in a number of EU institutions (including the European Commission and European External Action Service

Embassy 
The embassy is located at 66 Merrion Square. The public entrance is located towards the rear of the building at 66 Fitzwilliam Lane.

Diplomatic relations 

Relations between France and Ireland began when the Irish Free State gained independence in 1922, however, it was not until 1930 that the French Legation was created.

The legation was upgraded to an Embassy in 1950, shortly after Ireland declared itself as a republic in 1948.

Former Embassy Building 

In 1930, 53 Ailesbury Road was acquired by the French government for the French legation to the Irish Free State. It also housed the official residence of the first French Minister to the Irish Free State, Charles Alphand. 

Initially known as Mytilene, the building was designed by Irish architect Alfred Gresham Jones and was completed over two years between 1883 and 1885.

The French legation was transferred from its original location in Leixlip Castle, to the newly renovated Ailesbury Road address on 7 April 1931. 

In 2015 the French Embassy moved to its current location in Merrion Square and the original building continues to serve as the official residence of the French Ambassador.

Gallery

See also 

 France–Ireland relations
 Foreign relations of Ireland
 List of diplomatic missions in Ireland

References 

Diplomatic missions in Dublin (city)
Diplomatic missions of France